Electone is the trademark used for electronic organs produced by Yamaha. With the exception of the top end performance models, most Electones are based on the design of the spinet electronic organ. Current models are completely digital and contain a variety of sounds, effects, and accompaniments, on top of the ability to store programming data onto memory devices.

History

After Hammond pioneered the electronic organ in the 1930s, other manufacturers began to market their own versions of the instrument. By the end of the 1950s, familiar brand names of home organs in addition to Hammond included Conn, Kimball, Lowrey, and others, while companies such as Allen and Rodgers manufactured large electronic organs designed for church and other public settings.

The Yamaha Electone firstly made as a prototype concept in 1958, named "E-T". Then, the Yamaha Electone series finally made its debut in 1959 with the D-1, a home instrument. By 1980, with the market waning sharply, and some manufacturers ceasing production, the Electone line embraced digital technology. This allowed Electone's survival as the traditional home electronic organ market dried up. The product name "Electone", coined from the word "Electronic" and "Tone", that later it became so popular throughout the whole country that it was mistaken for the common noun of electronic organs in later years.

By the 1980s, many of the most famous names had ceased home production, but the Electone successfully transitioned to the modern world of digital synthesizers, now competing with such new electronic products as Moog Music, Wersi, and later Kurzweil. Electones were to be found not only in homes, especially in Japan and elsewhere in the East Asia, but also in bands and other solo and group public performances.

Notable former models

Yamaha began exporting Electones to the United States, starting with the D-2B in 1967.

 1958 — E-T Prototype
 The E-T was firstly as a prototype concept by Nippon Gakki (known as Yamaha today). It consists of one console, four oscillators, a tone-forming part widening device, and three speakers. The consoles consists of a three-stage keyboard, a 32-key pedal keyboard, and 171 switches of sounds and other functions for the prototype organ.
 1959 — Prototype ET-5 and EM-6
 In May 1959, the prototype ET-5 was manufactured, along with the prototype EM-6, a single-stage keyboard that were made out of transistors.
 1959 — D-1 
 First model of Electone that was launch by Yamaha, starting with the price around ¥350.000 at that time. 
 1960 — A-2 
 The first Electone model with only a single keyboard and a single octave pedal. With the price of ¥128.000, mostly used for students. Discontinued in 1963. 
 1962 — E-1 
 The highest and expensive Electone model at that time, with the price of ¥647.000 in 1962.
 1964 — F-1 
 Electone's first "pipe" organ model and rarely known, that was built for 15 years, from 1964 to 1979. The original price tag was around ¥2,200,000, removing the E-1 and making it the most expensive Electone models in its era.
 1966 — A-3  
 Electone's first combo organ, but only equipped with a single keyboard and an expression pedal. 
 1966 — F-2  
 Another Electone's "pipe" organ product. Discontinued in 1975. Price tag was around ¥1,350,000.
 1967 — D-2B 
 The first Electone Model that was import by Nippon Gakki to USA. 
 1968 — E-3 
 Yamaha's top model at that time, mostly for stage purposes. Original price tag was ¥800,000.
 1968 — EX-21 Prototype
 The EX-21 was known as a prototype for the upcoming futuristic, space-age style stage organ models in the future. Different from prior Electones, it was expressly designed for stage performances. Named 21 based on the word, "21st century", which basically meant, "Futuristic organ from the 21st century". The sounds and recordings can be heard from the "Electone Fantastic!" Album, in both volume.
 1970 — EX-42 
 This became Yamaha's first commercially available stage model Electone. The name was based on its prototype, EX-21, but multiplying two times. It was also the first to use integrated circuits, although it was still based on analogue technology. Famous Electone players such as Shigeo Sekito used this instrument to make "Special Sound Series", known as "華麗なるエレクトーン" (1975-1977). It was built from 1970 until 1977. When released in 1970, in Japan this sold for ¥2,800,000, while in the US, the EX-42 had a $32,000 price tag. That is $200,000 today when adjusted for inflation, and it is rumored that less than 200 of these were built.
 1972 — D-3R
 Another top model of Electone models, mostly used for homes. 
 1974 — Designing of Electones around synthesisers, instead of organs
 1974 — CSY-1
 Based on the SY-1 synthesizer.
 1975 — GX-1 (a.k.a. GX-707)
 The first polyphonic synthesizer in Electone form, bridging the gap between synthesizer and organ. It used velocity-sensitive keyboards and the solo keyboard was even after-touch sensitive. The original price tag at that time was around ¥7,000,000. Some notable users of the GX-1 include Richard D. James,.  Stevie Wonder, Keith Emerson, John Paul Jones, and Benny Andersson of ABBA.<ref name=Lundy2007p3iii>{{cite book |chapter=III. Experience |first=Zeth |last=Lundy |date=2007 |title=Stevie Wonder's Songs in the Key of Life |publisher=Bloomsbury Publishing |page=3-iii |isbn=978-1-4411-7012-5 |quote={{smaller|This confused tiem of transition also coincided with Wonder's privileged acceleration to the cutting edge of synthesizer technology. He was one of the lucky few (along with ELP's Keith Emerson, Led Zeppelin's John Paul Jones and ABBA's Benny Andersson, among others) to obrain a Yamaha GX1, a test model synthesizer that had recently been issued in an extremely limited run.}} }}</ref>
 1977 — EX-1, EX-2
 The third generation of space-age stage Electone models. Original price tag was ¥3,600,000 for the EX-1, and ¥2,600,000 for the EX-2, so there a ¥1,000,000 difference between them.
 1977 — E-70
 One of the first home based organs to feature Yamaha's PASS (Pulse Analog Synthesis System) in a console cabinet. E-70's architecture resembles the famous CS-80 synthesizer. But it does not have any analog VCOs in it. The original price tag was ¥1,800,000.
 1979 — CN-70
 A single-keyboard model most likely marketed to music schools.
 1980 — D-700
 More advanced and the upgraded version of its predecessor models. 
 1983 — FS and FX series (FC/FE/FS/FX)
 Featured FM (Frequency Modulation) tone generators and the FX series featured the company's first digitally sampled sounds for the onboard percussion/rhythm units. The F series Electones were the first to allow users to digitally save registrations via pistons and then save them to RAM packs or an external disk drive unit: MDR-1. It is also known as the fourth generation of the space-age stage models, costing around ¥4,500,000. While the lower version of the FX-1, the FX-3, cost around ¥2,000,000. Along with the FS-30m, cost around ¥1,100,000. The FX-10 cost around ¥1,900,000, while the FX-20 costs around ¥2,200,000. Then, the FE-30m costs only ¥490,000. 
 1983 — CN-1000
 A single chord organ made by Yamaha in their Electone models. 
 1985 — ME series 
 A smaller and compact Electone series, starting from range ME-15 to ME-600. Discontinued in 1989. The highest model, the ME-600 costs around ¥580,000, while the lowest one, the ME-15, costs only ¥204,000. 
 1987 — HS and HX series (HA/HC/HE/HK/HS/HX)
 Electones became more digital here. It used more integrated circuit technology to make components smaller, and hence allowed for a sleeker design. The HX/HS series was the first to use AWM (Advance Wave Memory) "sampling" technology for both voices and rhythms, and also featured 16-operator FM voices. AWM Voice expansion is also possible via sound packs. Smaller version for Electone classes were also available, named HK-10 and HA-1. HK-10 had the same design as the HC, but with bigger cover. The HA-1 was a chord organ. The HA-1 was rarely seen today, even though it was manufactured from 1988 to 2001. The original price for HS-8 was ¥835,000, while the HX-1 costs around ¥3,321,000.
 1991 — EL series
 This series included an attached Music Disk Recorder which enabled players to record their registrations and performances, thus eliminating the need for extensive programming before each performance. The EL series introduced new synthesisers, filtering, and expression technologies that made instrument voices on the Electone even more realistic. Voice technology continued to be based on AWM and FM technologies. The EL-90 costs around ¥1,250,000, while the ELX-1 costs twice the EL-90, around ¥2,700,000. 
 1996 — AR series
 The AR100, and its junior model the AR80 (released in 1997), were designed for the US and European market, and reverted to the more traditional cabinet design. Using purely AWM voices, the most distinctive feature of the series is its 384 preset registrations. A huge increase compared to only 5 presets on the EL series.
 1998 — EL-900 (Second version of EL series)
 Visually similar to the EL90 model from 1991, but with more voices, rhythms and effects, the most significant change of this model is the inclusion of VA (Virtual Acoustic) voices. These voices, or preset sounds, do not use sampling technology but is instead based on modeling. Thus providing a different level of authenticity.
 2000 — ELX-1m
 Same as before, visually similar to the EL90 model from 1991, but with more voices, rhythms and effects, the most significant change of this model is the inclusion of VA (Virtual Acoustic) voices. These voices, or preset sounds, do not use sampling technology but is instead based on modeling. Thus providing a different level of authenticity.
 2004 — Stagea Series 
 The brand new Electone line-up series, adding around 415 voices and sounds in the standard model (ELS-01), and including the "articulation voices". The models only sold to the Asia Pacific, such as Southeast Asia and East Asia, due to less demand on Europe and America. 
 2005 — ELS-01C and ELS-01X
 Same with the standard Stagea model, the ELS-01, but the ELS-01X had 2x61 keyboards, both upper and lower keyboard, and 25 keys on pedalboard. Both this version and the other custom model, the ELS-01C, had around 509 voices with articulation voices.
 2006 — ELB-01 
 Another Stagea line-up product, but it is mainly used for children and students in Electone course. The ELB-01K version later came out in the same year. 
 2007 — D-Deck (DDK-7) 
 Another Stagea line-up product, but more compact, and mostly used for concerts. Designed as a combo organ, same as the Hammond Portable B-3.
 2009 — ELS-01U / ELS-01CU / ELS-01XU 
 A minor upgrade for first generation stagea models.  
 2014 — "02" Stagea series.
 The new make-over of 2nd generation of Stagea series. Releasing the third big models, the standard model (ELS-02), the custom model (ELS-02C), and the professional model (ELS-02X). Same as before, but upgrading into Super-articulation voices, more registration banks, and double the voices and sounds including to the second generation model. The basics, the ELS-02, had around 986 voices and sounds including Super Articulation voices. The ELS-02C and ELS-02X had around 1.080 voices and sounds with Super Articulation voices. The basic models (ELS-02) stars with the price of ¥715.000, the custom model (ELS-02C) starts with the price of ¥1.078.000, and the professional model (ELS-02X) starts with the price of ¥1.738.000. Prices including tax.
 2016 — ELB-02 
 Same as its predecessor, the ELB-02, but with more advanced sounds and major updates. The original price with tax starts around ¥198.000.
 2016 — ELC-02 
 Another Stagea line-up product, and the successor of Stagea D-DECK, designed as a combo organ, same design as the Hammond Portable B-3, and use it on everywhere you go. The original price with tax starts around ¥539.000.

Glossary

 ABC
 Auto Bass Chord. Auto accompaniment function, in the form of backing chords and effects, activated when the lower keyboard is held while rhythms are playing.
 Advanced Wave Memory
 Yamaha's sound sampling technology introduced in the 90s. As of 2014, AWM has evolved to generation two and is usually termed AWM2 or AWMII.
 Frequency Modulation
 Yamaha's sound modelling technology used in Electones from the 70s to 90s. The final model to feature FM technology is the EL900 and all its variants.
 Keyboard Percussion
 Drums and percussion sounds that can be assigned to both keyboards and the pedalboard. Also used to create custom drum rhythms.
 Lead Voice
 The solo voice typically used for the melody line. Lead voices are monophonic on all Electone models.
 Lower Keyboard Voice
 General term referring to sounds selected and assigned to the lower keyboard. Polyphonic by preset.
 Music Data Recorder (MDR, before Electone Stagea named Music Disc Recorder)
 Memory storage device installed to, or part of Electone models from the HS series onwards. Allows storage and quick call up of complex sound and rhythm settings.
 Melody On Chord (MOC)
 Harmonizing effect activated on the lower keyboard based on note played on the upper keyboard.
 Pedal Voice
 General term referring to sounds selected and assigned to the pedalboard. Monophonic by preset except on the latest ELS-02 series.
 Registration
 Electone term referring to sounds selected for each keyboard and the pedal board. Includes also rhythm pattern selected. Also refers to user memory slots available on the Electone itself.
 Rhythm
 Drum patterns available on the Electone. Comes with different accompaniments.
 Rhythm Sequence Program (RSP)
 Sequencing function used to string different rhythm patterns together. When activated, the entire sequence plays by itself regardless of sound or memory changes on the Electone, thus allowing the player to concentrate on performance. Also allows for auto changing of registrations.
 Rhythm Pattern Program (RPP)
 Programming function for designing custom drum patterns and accompaniments.
 Upper Keyboard Voice
 General term referring to sounds selected and assigned to the upper keyboard. Polyphonic by preset.
 Virtual Acoustic
 Yamaha's sound modelling technology introduced with the EL900 in 1998. Features higher realism compared to Frequency Modulation. Continues to be available in top end models as of 2014.
 Voices
 General term referring to sounds on the Electone.

 STAGEA series 

In 2004, Yamaha launched the STAGEA series. This series uses all AWM (Advanced Wave Memory) voices and features over 180 digital effects, built-in registration menus, VA (Virtual Acoustic) voices, and a Style-File compatible expanded rhythm and accompaniment section. AWM is the proprietary sound sampling technology of Yamaha.

Models in this series are:

ELS-01: The standard model

ELS-01C: The custom model, carrying the ability to use the VA voices, Pitch and Tempo Bends, After touch on the pedal keyboard, horizontal touch and after pitch, along with other features, and lastly,

ELS-01X: The professional model - taking the ELS-01C, it adds 61-note keyboards, a 25-note pedal board and XLR external audio jacks.

The STAGEA ELS-01 series was officially distributed only in Asian countries.In 2006, Yamaha added the ELB-01 model to the lineup. This is a students' model, with 245 AWM voices and 133 accompaniment rhythms, but without voice or rhythm editing capabilities.

In 2008, Yamaha added The D-Deck (DDK-7 in some markets), which is the portable version of the ELS-01 with a more compact body, 61 keys on the lower keyboard and an optional pedalboard. The D-Deck comes with all the features of the ELS-01, with the additions also of Organ Flute voices and a second expression pedal.

In 2009, the STAGEA typeU series was launched, with only hardware differences between them and their original counterparts. The typeU version omitted the floppy drive UD-FD01 and the Smart-Media card slot.

In April 2014, Yamaha launched the STAGEA ELS-02 series. This series features Super Articulation voices, on top of over 900 AWM sounds, 96 VA voices, pedalboard polyphony, effects, and 566 accompaniment rhythms. The ELS-01, ELS-01C and ELS-01X can also be upgraded to the current series by the use of a "Vitalize" unit.

The STAGEA ELS-02 series currently has three models:

ELS-02: The standard model, with 506 AWM voices including Super Articulation voices, 506 accompaniment rhythms, and hundreds of audio effects.

ELS-02C: The custom model. Other than all the features of the ELS-02, it has an additional 60 AWM voices, VA voices, Organ Flutes voices (with digital drawbars), a second expression pedal, horizontal keyboard touch, and pedal board aftertouch.

ELS-02X: The professional model, which contains all the features of the ELS-02C but with both keyboards expanded to 61 keys and the pedalboard expanded to 25 full pedals.

Unlike the first STAGEA series, the STAGEA ELS-02 series is distributed in both Asia and Mexico.

In May 2016, the ELB-02 model was launched as a revamp of the ELB-01 model with more voices and rhythms added as well as the "after touch" feature on the upper and lower keyboards.

ELC-02: In 2016, Yamaha launched the STAGEA ELC-02. This model is a replacement for the STAGEA D-Deck (DDK-7), this model contains most of the features of the ELS-02 such as Super Articulation voices. Unlike the previous D-Deck model, the ELC-02 does not contain a 61 note lower keyboard instead a standard 49 note keyboard resides in its place. Existing owners of the D-Deck can upgrade the main unit to the ELC-02 and use their current stand, expression pedals and speakers as is.

In 2022, Yamaha launched a new Electone, the ELA-1. This model is not part of the STAGEA series, and is currently sold in China and Malaysia. This Electone shares the architecture of the Yamaha PSR SX600 portable keyboard and features 3 keyboards (upper, lower and bass pedals).

Competition

The International Electone Festival (IEF)/International Electone Concours (IEC) is an Electone Organ competition organized by Yamaha which has its beginnings in the 1960s. The first edition of the competition initiated in 1964 as a Japanese national contest to promote and market the Electone as a viable creative and professional musical outlet, and featured both the solo performer and the Electone instrument with no other accompaniment present - a format that lasts till this day. The first purposefully branded international edition complete with a broader roster of contestants representing countries such as USA, Canada, Mexico, United Kingdom, Australia, South Africa, as well as European, Asian and South American countries,  is noted as being held in October of 1971. However, as earlier as 1969 and 1970, a small number of international entrants were invited to compete at the 'Electone Concours Grand Prix' event against a predominantly Japanese contingent of competitors in Tokyo. The IEF finals from these early editions were then held in Japan every year until 1984 when it was held in Los Angeles to mirror the city's Olympic Games hosting duties. Afterwards, Yamaha began holding subsequent IEF finals in other cities around the world including Hamburg, Toronto, Paris, Hong Kong, Mexico and Singapore before returning to Japan.

Notable musicians who were invited to be part of the adjudication panel included Jerry Goldsmith, Raymond Lefèvre and Keith Emerson of Emerson, Lake & Palmer. Participants in the IEF finals had to be at least 16 years of age and competed for medal awards and cash prizes. On almost every occasion, there was one "Grand Prize" recipient who would receive a gold medal and cash prize which in its last years totalled $10,000US. Before 1982, a selection of participants were also presented with special Winner's prizes and the number of recipients of this award varied from year to year. After 1982, "Most Outstanding Performance" awards were presented to two (or in some instances three or four) participants who would receive a silver medal and cash prize, and "Outstanding Performance" awards were usually presented to three participants who would receive a bronze medal and cash prize. On rare occasions at IEF finals, a special President's award may also have been presented to one performer. Known as the "Kawakami Prize" it was named after renowned Yamaha Music Corporation President Genichi Kawakami and consisted of a special bronze medal and cash prize very similar to the "Outstanding Performance" award. By the mid to late 1990s Yamaha ceased to sponsor the event as the broader international competition it once was, keeping it a solely Japanese and Asian region contest by the turn of the new millennium. This change, which reflected the company's decision to decrease its global Electone market to these territories exclusively, continues to this day as the Yamaha Electone Concours'' .

International Electone Festival Finals

In popular culture
The Electone HX model appears briefly in the 1987 science fiction film The Running Man. When Ben Richards is in Amber's apartment (18 minutes into the film), he chases her around the Electone. Two scenes later (at the 20 minute mark), Richards, while standing over it, asks her what it is. Amber calls it her "synthesizer setup" and reveals that she wrote the ICS network jingle. (starting at 5:45 and 9:30 in this clip)

See also
826aska

References

External links 
 

Electric and electronic keyboard instruments
Yamaha music products